Amori pericolosi is a 1964 anthology film consisting of three segments directed by Alfredo Giannetti, Carlo Lizzani and Giulio Questi.

Cast 
 Il generale
 Grégoire Aslan: The General
 Sandra Milo:  The lover of the General
 Marco Tulli
La ronda 
 Frank Wolff: The husband
 Ornella Vanoni: The prostitute
 Vittorio Congia 
 Glauco Onorato 
Il passo 
 Frank Wolff: The husband
 Juliette Mayniel: The wife
 Graziella Granata: The maid 
 Jean Sorel: The legionary
 Gérard Blain: The attendant
 Bice Valori: The servant

Production
Director Giulio Questi was a last minute addition as a director for Amori pericolosi. Questi recalled that Peppino Amato and Moris Ergas were both the initial producers for the film and that Amato died which led to Ergas taking over as the producer. The film was shot in 1961 and only released later in 1964.

Release
Amori pericolosi was distributed theatrically in Italy by Cineriz on 14 August 1964. The film grossed a total of 48,300,000 Italian lire. Film historian and critic Roberto Curti described the films box office presence in Italy as being "passed unnoticed".

Reception
According to Curti, critics did not like Amori pericolosi, especially "Il passo" directed by Giulio Questi, with critic Alberto Abruzzese  finding it conveying "an old and decrepit theme with a formal refinement that was between mannered decadence and a misunderstood naturalism."

References

Sources

External links

1964 films
Italian comedy films
French comedy films
Films directed by Carlo Lizzani
Films directed by Alfredo Giannetti
Italian anthology films
Films directed by Giulio Questi
1964 comedy films
French anthology films
Films scored by Carlo Rustichelli
1960s Italian films
1960s French films